The 2022 summer transfer window for Paraguayan football transfers of the Asociación Paraguaya de Fútbol follows in an incomplete list.

Transactions

Transfers
All players and clubs without a flag are Paraguayan. Multiple transfers made in one day by a club are listed alphabetically, based on their forename.

Loans

References

summer 2022
Paraguay